The 2014–15 FC Arsenal Tula season was the club's first season in the Russian Premier League, the highest tier of association football in Russia, and 7th in total. Terek Grozny will also be taking part in the Russian Cup.

Squad

Out on loan

Youth Team

Transfers

Summer

In:

Out:

Winter

In:

Out:

Competitions

Russian Premier League

Results by round

Matches

League table

Russian Cup

Squad statistics

Appearances and goals

|-
|colspan="14"|Players away from the club on loan:

|-
|colspan="14"|Players who appeared for Arsenal Tula no longer at the club:

|}

Goal scorers

Disciplinary record

Notes
 MSK time changed from UTC+4 to UTC+3 permanently on 26 October 2014.

References

FC Arsenal Tula seasons
Arsenal Tula